Events from the year 1997 in Burkina Faso

Incumbents
President: Blaise Compaoré
Prime Minister: Kadré Désiré Ouedraogo

Events
11 May: Burkinabe parliamentary election, 1997

Deaths

References

 
Burkina Faso
Years of the 20th century in Burkina Faso
Burkina Faso
1990s in Burkina Faso